The 2010 Shamrock Rovers F.C. season was the club's 89th season competing in the League of Ireland and the team's second season under the stewardship of Michael O'Neill. The team finished the season as Premier Division 
champions, narrowly beating rivals Bohemians to the title by virtue of a better goal difference. 

Gary Twigg concluded the season as the league's top goalscorer for the second season in succession. The Hoops reached the 2010 FAI Cup Final, the semifinals of the 2010 League of Ireland Cup, the quarterfinals of the 2010 Leinster Senior Cup and defeated Bnei Yehuda Tel Aviv F.C. in the second qualifying round of the UEFA Europa League before losing to Juventus in the next round.

The team played a direct style of football throughout the season, with Michael O'Neill generally employing the 4–5–1 formation.

Preseason
The club made a number of signings during the off-season and preseason in an effort to strengthen the squad. Enda Stevens and James Chambers were signed at the end of 2009, the former agreeing to a one-year contract. They were joined by Chris Turner, Craig Walsh and Billy Dennehy in January 2010, while Dan Murray and Danny Murphy signed for the club in February. The signing of Chris Turner was disputed by Sligo Rovers and eventually sanctioned in March. The team played four preseason friendlies, winning three and drawing one.

Squad
All players used during the season:

Out on loan
All players loaned out during the season:

Transfers
All players transferred during the season:

Technical staff
Coach: Michael O'Neill
Assistant coach: Trevor Croly
Goalkeeping coach: Tim Dalton
Physiotherapist: Albert Byrne

Premier Division

Matches

Final Table

Cups

FAI Cup

League of Ireland Cup

Leinster Senior Cup

UEFA Europa League

References

External links
2010 Fixture List
Statistics & Reports

Shamrock Rovers F.C. seasons
Shamrock Rovers